Farley Hill is a national park in Saint Peter, Barbados. It is on the site of Grenade Hall Plantation, established in the seventeenth century.

External links
 Video of Farley Hill, filmed from a drone from high above

References

Geography of Barbados